Kayahisar is a village in the Palu District of Elazığ Province in Turkey. Its population is 118 (2021). The village is populated by Kurds.

References

Villages in Palu District
Kurdish settlements in Elazığ Province